John Maurice Kelly (31 August 1931 – 24 January 1991) was an Irish Fine Gael politician who served as Minister for Trade, Commerce and Tourism from 1981 to 1982, acting Minister for Foreign Affairs from June 1981 to October 1981, Attorney General from May 1977 to July 1977 and Government Chief Whip from 1973 to 1977. He served as a Teachta Dála (TD) for the Dublin South-Central from 1973 to 1977 and for Dublin South from 1977 to 1989. He was a Senator for the Cultural and Educational Panel from 1969 to 1973.

Education
Kelly received his primary and secondary education at St Conleth's College in Dublin 4 and at the Glenstal Abbey School in County Limerick, respectively.

He attended University College Dublin between 1949 and 1954, and carried out postgraduate studies in the Heidelberg University, Germany, from 1954 to 1956. His thesis was published in 1957 as "Princeps Iudex".

Academic career
In the early 1960s, Kelly held a position as a don in Trinity College, Oxford.

He was a distinguished academic, serving for many years as Professor of Constitutional law, Roman law and Jurisprudence in University College Dublin. He was author of the standard work on the Constitution of Ireland; though published after Kelly's death, the third and later editions of this work still bear his name in honour of the original book. He was instrumental in the revival of the Irish law journal The Irish Jurist in the 1960s.

Political career
He first stood for election at the 1969 general election as a Fine Gael candidate in the Dublin South-Central constituency. He was not elected to Dáil Éireann on that occasion, but was subsequently elected to Seanad Éireann as a Senator for the Cultural and Educational Panel. He was elected to Dublin South-Central on his second attempt at the 1973 general election as a Fine Gael TD. He was elected for Dublin County South in 1977, and for Dublin South constituency from 1981 until his retirement from politics at the 1989 general election.

He served in the government of Liam Cosgrave (1973–77) as Parliamentary Secretary to the Taoiseach with responsibility as Government Chief Whip and as Parliamentary Secretary to the Minister for Defence. In May 1977, he was appointed as Attorney General of Ireland, succeeding Declan Costello upon the latter's appointment to the High Court.

He served in Garret FitzGerald's first cabinet from 1981 until 1982 as Minister for Trade, Commerce and Tourism. Kelly was also appointed as acting Minister for Foreign Affairs, pending the appointment of James Dooge, who was to be appointed to the Seanad, and as a Minister in October 1981.

Kelly declined appointment to FitzGerald's second government (1982–87). Kelly felt that Irish politics should be aligned more on European ideological lines, and he promoted closer alignment with Fianna Fáil and the end of coalition with the Labour Party. He did not seek re-election to the Dáil at the 1989 general election.

Personal life
Kelly's son Nick was lead singer and songwriter with Irish rock band The Fat Lady Sings.

Kelly died on 24 January 1991, aged 59, after suffering a heart attack.

Publications
Fiction:
Matters of Honour [as John Boyle] (London, New Authors Limited, 1964)
The Polling of the Dead (Moytura Press, 1993) 

Non-Fiction:
Fundamental rights in the Irish law and Constitution (2nd ed., Oceana Publications, 1968) 
Studies in the civil judicature of the Roman Republic (Oxford, Clarendon Press, 1976) 
The Irish Constitution (1st ed., 1980)
Belling the cats: Selected speeches and articles of John Kelly (Dublin, Moytura Press, 1992) 
A Short History of Western Legal Theory (Oxford University Press, 1992)

Honours, awards and memorials

John M. Kelly Memorial Lecture
Since 1994, University College Dublin has hosted an annual John M. Kelly Memorial Lecture on law, with international legal experts asked to deliver papers. The lectures to date include:
 (November 1994) Savigny in the Strand – the Rt. Hon, the Lord Rodger of Earlsferry QC
 (16 November 1995) Harassment and Hubris: The Right to an Equality of Respect – Prof. Peter Birks, Regius Professor of Civil Law at the University of Oxford
 (14 November 1996) A Sense of Proportionality – the Rt. Hon, the Lord Leonard Hoffman
 (October 1997) Towards a Supreme Court? The British Experience – Michael Beloff, QC and President of Trinity College Oxford
 (November 1998)
 (October 1999) Stands Scotland where she did? New Unions for Old in these Islands – Prof Neil MacCormick
 (November 2000)
 (1 November 2001) Corrective and Distributive Justice in Tort Law – the Rt. Hon, the Lord Steyn
 (15 November 2002) Scholarship, Reputation of Scholarship, and Legacy: Provocative Reflections from a Comparatist’s Point of View – Prof. Basil Markesinis QC
 (5 November 2003) Liability for Non-Conformity: The new system of remedies in German sales' law and its historical context – Prof. Reinhard Zimmermann
 (21 January 2005) Law Maker or Law Reformer – what is a Law Lady for? – the Rt. Hon, the Baroness Brenda Hale of Richmond
 (7 October 2010) Should Strict Criminal Liability be Removed from all Imprisonable Offences? – Professor Andrew Ashworth, the Vinerian Professor of English Law at the University of Oxford
 (27 March 2014) Justice, Memory and Art - Mr Justice Albie Sachs
 (16 April 2015) Diversity in Family Life: Developments in the Case Law of the European Court of Human Rights - Ms Ann Power Forde, SC
 (5 May 2016) International Aspects of the Constitution: Skibbereen Eagle or a Shaft of Dawn for the Despairing and Wretched Everywhere? - The Hon. Mr. Justice Donal O’Donnell
 (9 March 2017) Adverse Possession - Still an Ailing Concept? - Professor John Wylie
 (8 March 2018) On Lord Ellenborough's Law of Humanity - Professor Gerry Whyte
 (31 January 2019) Populism and the Rule of Law - Professor Nicola Lacey CBE
 (26 March 2020) Law, Legitimacy and the Nation State - Lord Sumption

The Irish Jurist Memorial Issue
Volumes XXV-XXVII of The Irish Jurist, covering the years 1990–1992, were published in memory of John Kelly.

References

 

1931 births
1991 deaths
Attorneys General of Ireland
Fine Gael TDs
Irish legal scholars
Members of the 12th Seanad
Members of the 20th Dáil
Members of the 21st Dáil
Members of the 22nd Dáil
Members of the 23rd Dáil
Members of the 24th Dáil
Members of the 25th Dáil
Ministers for Foreign Affairs (Ireland)
Parliamentary Secretaries of the 20th Dáil
Politicians from County Dublin
Academics of University College Dublin
Academics of the University of Oxford
People educated at St Conleth's College
People educated at Glenstal Abbey School
Heidelberg University alumni
Alumni of University College Dublin
20th-century Irish lawyers
Fine Gael senators
Government Chief Whip (Ireland)
Ministers for Enterprise, Trade and Employment